Louis Cancelmi (pronounced ; born June 9, 1978) is an American stage and film actor. He is a frequent performer in productions by the Public Theater, both at their Astor Library home and at the Delacorte Theater in Central Park. He is best known for appearances in Boardwalk Empire, Blue Bloods, and The Irishman.

Early life
Cancelmi was born in Pittsburgh. His family relocated to California, then to Anchorage, and then to Seattle, with Anchorage being Cancelmi's self-identified hometown. He is the brother of actress Annie Parisse.

Cancelmi started acting in high school plays. He attended Yale College, entering with interests in writing and mathematics but ultimately majoring in theater.

Personal life

He is married to Elisabeth Waterston, daughter of Sam Waterston, with whom Cancelmi acted in Please Be Normal in 2014 and Shakespeare in the Park's The Tempest in 2015. The couple lives in the Hudson Valley with their children.

Filmography

References

External links
 
 
 
 

1978 births
21st-century American male actors
American male Shakespearean actors
American male stage actors
Living people